The 1995 Cupa României Final was the 57th final of Romania's most prestigious cup competition. The final was played at the Stadionul Naţional in Bucharest on 21 June 1995 and was contested between Divizia A sides Petrolul Ploieşti and Rapid București. The cup was won by Petrolul on penalties.

Route to the final

Match details

References

External links
 Official site 

Cupa Romaniei Final, 1995
Cupa României Finals
1995
Cupa Romaniei Final 1995